The Battle of Tabarde was fought over three days from 3 to 5 June 2018, between ISIL militants and a Tuareg coalition that consisted of the Imghad Tuareg Self-Defense Group and Allies (GATIA) and the Movement for the Salvation of Azawad (MSA).

Timeline 
On 3 June 2018, Tuareg GATIA/MSA fighters clashed with ISIL militants under the command of Amat Ag Assalate and Almahmoud Ag Akawkaw, in the Tabarde area of Mali's northern Ménaka Region. The two ISIL commanders were responsible for an earlier ambush on a Malian convoy in Inkadogotane in July 2017. The fighting lasted for three days, and afterwards, the Tuaregs claimed that three are their fighters were killed, while three others were wounded, and that at least six ISIL militants were also killed and many others were captured. Weapons and vehicles were also reportedly captured by the Tuaregs. Almahmoud Ag Akawkaw was captured after the battle, while Amat Ag Assalate was killed during the fighting.

References 

Tabarde
Tabarde
2018 in Mali